KEYB (107.9 FM, "108 Key FM") is a radio station licensed to Altus, Oklahoma, United States. The station is currently owned by Monte Spearman and Gentry Todd Spearman, through licensee High Plains Radio Network, LLC.
KEYB has television advertising available with local cable insertion, and complete digital production services offered. Operations Manager is Tracie Tobitt and Sales/Promotions Manager is Trudy Calvillo. Reach by phone at (580) 482-1555. Bryson Culwell is the former Program Director, during his time at KEYB he was the youngest at the position in the State of Oklahoma

References

External links

EYB
Radio stations established in 1991
1991 establishments in Oklahoma